Madeleine Mary Bingham (1912-1988,  Ebel, sometimes misspelled Madeline) was a playwright, novelist and historian. She also wrote under the pseudonym Julia Mannering. She was married to John Bingham, 7th Baron Clanmorris, so had the title Baroness Clanmorris.

Early life and wartime work
Madeleine Ebel was born on 1 February 1912, the eldest daughter of Clement Ebel, managing director of a firm of interior decorators, and met John Bingham at a secretarial college, where he was learning shorthand and typing to prepare for a planned post as private secretary to a millionaire. They married on 28 July 1934. Madeleine worked for some time as a journalist on The Times.
 
Both Madeleine and John joined the Security Service soon after the start of World War II. She worked at Blenheim Palace in administration and later in the Special Operations Executive, when she was based at the HQ in Baker Street and "kept a drawer of suicide tablets for agents".

Writing
Bingham wrote plays, historical biographies, and a miscellany of other books. She published her autobiography Peers and Plebs: Two Families in a Changing World in 1975, in which she described the contrast between her and her husband's backgrounds: hers Catholic, with mid-European roots, and his firmly Northern-Irish protestant. The book only covers her life up to 1937 and the birth of her son: she makes no reference to her or her husband's work with the security service. It is said that she had later planned to write a book about her husband's life, including the suggestion that he had been the model for John le Carré's character George Smiley, but that she was firmly told that "no such book would be tolerated".

Her plays included a three-act comedy, The Men From The Ministry, first performed at the Aldwych Theatre in London in 1946 and later in Bristol in 1948 or 1949, and The Real Mccoy, performed in Sheffield in 1964.

A collection of the papers of John and Madeleine Bingham is held in the Gotlieb Contemporary Archive Collection at Boston University Libraries

Personal life
Madeleine Bingham died suddenly on 16 February 1988; her husband died six months later from cancer, and they were survived by their two children. Their son inherited the title and is Simon Bingham, 8th Baron Clanmorris (born 1937), and their daughter is the writer Charlotte Bingham (born 1942).

Selected publications 
Bingham's publications listed in the catalogue of the British Library or WorldCat include:
The man from the ministry: French, 1947, a play
The Passionate Poet, etc: Museum Press, 1951, a novel by "Julia Mannering" about Lord Byron's love-life
Look to the rose: Museum Press, 1953, a novel by "Julia Mannering"
Cheapest in the end: Dodd, Meade, 1963
Your wedding guide: Transworld, 1967
Something's burning : the bad cook's guide: Corgi, 1968
Teach your own child: Transworld, 1968
A Career for your daughter: Corgi, 1969
How to be a good daughter-in-law: Redemptorist Publications, 1969
Mary, Queen of Scots: International Textbook, 1969 on Mary, Queen of Scots
A career at forty: Transworld, 1971
Scotland under Mary Stuart : an account of everyday life: Allen and Unwin, 1971
Sheridan: the track of a comet:  Allen and Unwin, 1972, on Richard Brinsley Sheridan
Masks and façades: Sir John Vanbrugh, the man in his setting: Allen and Unwin, 1974, on John Vanbrugh
The Making of Kew: Joseph, 1975, on Kew Gardens
Peers and plebs: two families in a changing world: Allen and Unwin, 1975, autobiography up to 1937
Henry Irving and the Victorian theatre: Allen and Unwin, 1978, on Henry Irving (published in USA as Henry Irving: the greatest Victorian actor )
'The great lover' : the life and art of Herbert Beerbohm Tree: H. Hamilton, 1978, on Herbert Beerbohm Tree<ref> Review of "The Great Lover")</ref>Earls and girls: dramas in high society: H. Hammilton, 1980Princess Lieven : Russian intriguer: Hamish Hamilton, 1982, on Dorothea LievenBelinda and the baron : or The rape of the lock : a period comedy with music, based on the poem by Alexander Pope'' / words by Madeleine Bingham and Suzanne Ebel.: Thames, 1989

References

External links

British women novelists
British women dramatists and playwrights
British women historians
1912 births
1988 deaths